Aristaea bathracma is a species of moth of the family Gracillariidae. It is known from China, Thailand, Japan (Honshū), the Russian Far East, Mozambique, South Africa, Réunion and Uganda.

The wingspan is 7.2-8.8 mm.

The larvae feed on Aster ageratoides. They mine the leaves of their host plant. There are four instars. The mine starts as a rather broad linear mine which usually runs along the middle vein or leaf-margin. A short time after, it broadens the linear mine into a blotch. In these stages the mine occupies a thin layer just above the lower epidermis of the leaf and is whitish-green in colour. In the third and fourth instars, the larva feeds on the upper layers of the tissue within the blotch-mine made during the preceding instar. At the same time, it wrinkles up the lower epidermis of the leaf to form a tentiform mine. After the consumption of the
tissues within the mine, the larva leaves the mine through a round exit hole to form a cocoon. The cocoon is usually found on either upper or lower surface at the middle vein near apex of the leaf, whitish, and boat-shaped.

References

Aristaea
Lepidoptera of Uganda
Moths of Japan
Moths of Africa
Moths described in 1912